Béard-Géovreissiat is a commune in the Ain department in eastern France.  Prior to 6 October 2008, it was known as Géovreissiat.

Population

See also
Communes of the Ain department

References

Communes of Ain